Tolpropamine is an antihistamine and anticholinergic used as an antipruritic.

References 

H1 receptor antagonists
Benzhydryl compounds